Tom Vandenberghe (born 17 August 1992) is a Belgian footballer who plays as a goalkeeper for Kortrijk in the Belgian First Division A.

Career

Deinze
Vandenberghe signed with Deinze in 2015. He made his debut for the club on 24 October 2015 in a 1-1 draw with Antwerp. In March 2019, Vandenberghe signed a three-year extension with the club.

Kortrijk
On 9 February 2022, Vandenberghe signed a three-year contract with Kortrijk, beginning in the 2022–23 season.

Career statistics

Club

References

External links
Tom Vandenberghe at Sofa Score
Tom Vandenberghe at the Belgian Pro League

1992 births
Living people
Belgian footballers
Association football goalkeepers
K.M.S.K. Deinze players
K.V. Kortrijk players
Challenger Pro League players
Belgian Third Division players